The British 3rd Destroyer Flotilla, also styled as Third Destroyer Flotilla, was a naval formation of the Royal Navy from 1909 to 1939 and again from 1945 to 1951.

History
In 1907 the Channel Fleet had a large Channel Flotilla of destroyers in February 1909 when it was divided to form the 1st and 3rd Destroyer Flotillas. From March 1909 to May 1912 the formation was part of the Nore Division, 3rd Division Home Fleet. In May 1912, the Home Fleet was split into the First Fleet, with ships in full commission, and the Second and Third Fleets, composed of ships partly manned and laid up in reserve respectively. The 3rd Destroyer Flotilla remained part of the First Fleet until July 1914. 

On the outbreak of the First World War, the First Fleet became the Grand Fleet, and the 3rd Destroyer Flotilla joined the newly formed Harwich Force. In the summer of 1915 it was renumbered the 9th Destroyer Flotilla. It was reformed again from  March 1918 as part of the Grand Fleet till November 1918.  

After the War the Flotilla joined the Atlantic Fleet, forming part of that organisation from December 1918 until August 1923. It was then allocated to the Mediterranean Fleet until 1926 when it was temporarily assigned to the China Station until 1927. It returned to the Mediterranean until 1938. By the beginning of World War Two in September 1939 it was still in the Mediterranean Fleet. It was re-allocated to the Home Fleet in October 1939 to November 1944 under the command of the Rear-Admiral, Destroyer Flotillas Home Fleet. The flotilla was sent back to join the Mediterranean Fleet in November 1944.

Throughout this period the term Flotilla had applied to a tactical unit. In 1951, instead, three specific Flag Officers, Flotillas, were created responsible for escorts up to cruisers for the Eastern, Home and Mediterranean fleets. The previous destroyer flotillas were redesignated squadrons, and thus the 3rd Destroyer Flotilla became the 3rd Destroyer Squadron in July 1951.

Operational deployments

Flotilla commander

The commander of the 3rd Destroyer Flotilla held the title of Captain (Destroyers), or 'Captain (D)'. Those officers included (incomplete list):

Composition 1945 to 1951
Included: 
, Mediterranean Fleet 1945
3rd Destroyer Flotilla
  (Leader)
 
 
 
 
 
, Mediterranean Fleet 1946
3rd Destroyer Flotilla
 HMS Troubridge (Leader)
 HMS Venus
 HMS Verulam
 HMS Virago
 HMS Volage
 HMS Brissenden 
, Mediterranean Fleet 1947
3rd Destroyer Flotilla
 HMS Troubridge (Leader)
 HMS Venus
 HMS Verulam
 HMS Virago
 HMS Volage
 HMS Brissenden 
  - (October 1947)
  -(October 1947)
  - (October 1947)
, Mediterranean Fleet  1948
3rd Destroyer Flotilla
 HMS Troubridge (Leader)
 HMS Venus
 HMS Verulam
 HMS Virago
 HMS Volage
, Mediterranean Fleet  1949
3rd Destroyer Flotilla
 HMS Troubridge (Leader)
 HMS Venus
 HMS Verulam
 HMS Virago
 HMS Volage - (July 1949)
  (Leader) (July 1949)
  - (July 1949)
  - (July 1949)
  - (July 1949)
, Mediterranean Fleet  1950
3rd Destroyer Flotilla
 HMS Saintes (Leader)
 HMS Armada
 HMS Gravelines
 HMS Vigo
, Mediterranean Fleet 1951
3rd Destroyer Flotilla
 HMS Saintes (Leader)
 HMS Armada
 HMS Gravelines
 HMS Vigo

References

Sources
 
 Harley, Simon; Lovell, Tony. (2018) "Third Destroyer Flotilla (Royal Navy) - The Dreadnought Project". www.dreadnoughtproject.org. Harley and Lovell, 29 May 2018. Retrieved 9 July 2018.
 Watson, Dr Graham. (2015) Royal Navy Organisation and Ship Deployments 1900-1914". www.naval-history.net. G. Smith. 
 Watson, Dr Graham. (2015) "Royal Navy Organisation and Ship Deployment, Inter-War Years 1914-1918". www.naval-history.net. Gordon Smith.
 Watson, Dr Graham. (2015) "Royal Navy Organisation in World War 2, 1939-1945". www.naval-history.net. Gordon Smith.

Destroyer flotillas of the Royal Navy
Military units and formations established in 1909
Military units and formations disestablished in 1939